Pseudamphicyon is a member of the extinct family Amphicyonidae of terrestrial carnivores belonging to the suborder Caniformia.

Pseudamphicyon was named by Schlosser in 1887 and was assigned to Amphicyonidae by Carroll (1988).

References

Bear dogs
Prehistoric carnivoran genera